Pedialyte is an oral electrolyte solution manufactured by Abbott Laboratories and marketed for use in children. It was invented by Dr. Gary Cohen of Swampscott, Massachusetts.

Description
Pedialyte is designed to promote rehydration and electrolyte replacement in ill children. It "meets the requirements of the American Academy of Pediatrics (AAP) Committee on Nutrition to help prevent dehydration in infants and children."

Pedialyte is lower in sugars than most sports drinks, containing 100 calories per liter compared to approximately 240 in Gatorade. It contains more sodium (1,035 milligrams per liter vs. 465 mg/L in Gatorade) and potassium (780 milligrams per liter vs. 127 mg/L in Gatorade). Pedialyte does not contain sucrose, because this sugar has the potential to make diarrhea worse by drawing water into the intestine, increasing the risk of dehydration. In its flavored formulations, Pedialyte uses the synthetic sweeteners sucralose and acesulfame potassium.

Pedialyte has become a hydration alternative to sports drinks for some athletes.

Pedialyte has become a popular drink for people suffering from hangovers, with one third of its sales coming from adults. There has been a 57% increase in its use by adults since 2012. As a result, Pedialyte has begun a marketing campaign promoting the use of Pedialyte by hungover adults.

Pedialyte is similar to rehydration fluids used by the World Health Organization (WHO) such as "New Oral Rehydration Solution" (N-ORS), that are used during the outbreak of illnesses such as cholera and rotavirus. Similar products include Lytren, NormaLyte, Gastrolyte, Ricelyte, Repalyte, Resol, Cordial, Hydralyte, Drip Drop, and Kinderlyte.

See also
 Suero Oral

References

External links
 

Babycare
Infant feeding
Infancy